Cheshma may refer to :
 Cheshmeh, West Azerbaijan (also known as Cheshma), a village in Iran
 Cheshma, Bulgaria, a village in Zlataritsa Municipality, Bulgaria
 Cheshma, Macedonia, a village in Kisela Voda Municipality, Macedonia

See also 
 Chashma (disambiguation)
 Chesma (disambiguation)
 Cheshmeh (disambiguation)